The 2014 Hilton HHonors Skate America was the first event of six in the 2014–15 ISU Grand Prix of Figure Skating, a senior-level international invitational competition series. It was held at the Sears Centre in Hoffman Estates, Illinois on October 24–26. Medals were awarded in the disciplines of men's singles, ladies' singles, pair skating, and ice dancing. Skaters earned points toward qualifying for the 2014–15 Grand Prix Final.

Entries

Changes to initial line-up
 On July 2, it was announced that Stefania Berton / Ondřej Hotárek had split up. On July 21, it was announced that their replacement was Elizaveta Usmanteseva / Roman Talan.
 On July 10, Douglas Razzano and Anastasia Cannuscio / Colin McManus were added as host picks.
 On July 18, Samantha Cesario was added as a host pick.
 On August 13, Maylin Wende / Daniel Wende were removed from the roster due to an injury to Daniel. On August 22, it was announced that Annabelle Prölß / Ruben Blommaert would be their replacements.
 On September 2, Madeline Aaron / Max Settlage were announced as host picks.
 On September 19, Elizaveta Usmantseva / Roman Talan were removed from the roster. No reason has been given. On September 23, it was announced that Miriam Ziegler / Severin Kiefer were their replacements.
 On September 20, it was reported that Ekaterina Bobrova / Dmitri Soloviev were going to be withdrawing due to an injury to Soloviev. They were removed from the roster on September 29. On October 1, Alexandra Stepanova / Ivan Bukin were announced as their replacements.
 On September 22, it was reported that Tatiana Volosozhar / Maxim Trankov were going to be withdrawing due to an injury to Trankov. On October 1, they were removed from the roster. On October 3, Vanessa Grenier / Maxime Deschamps were announced as their replacements.
 On October 2, Julia Zlobina / Alexei Sitnikov withdrew. No reason was given. On October 3, Federica Testa / Lukas Csolley were announced as their replacements.
 On October 10, Cathy Reed / Chris Reed were replaced by Élisabeth Paradis / François-Xavier Ouellette. No reason has been given.
 On October 17, Joshi Helgesson was removed from the roster due to an injury. She was not replaced.

Results

Men

Ladies

Pairs

Ice dancing

References

External links
 2014 Skate America at the International Skating Union
 Starting orders and result details

Skate America, 2014
Skate America